Tony Tedeschi is an American pornographic film actor and AVN Hall of Fame inductee.

Career
Before his pornography career, he worked as a deejay at the Foxy Lady strip club in Providence. He was spotted by Britt Morgan, who was performing there at the time, and later shot his first scenes with her in 1990.

Tedeschi has appeared in nearly 1,300 films between 1990 and 2012, and co-directed one, Late Night Sessions With Tony Tedeschi, with Bud Lee, in 2004. He has worked for companies such as Adam & Eve, Anabolic, Caballero Home Video, Coast to Coast, Dreamland Video, Elegant Angel, Evil Angel, Heatwave, Hustler Video, Kickass Pictures, Legend Video, Leisure Time Entertainment and many others.

Appearances
He appeared in the 1997 Paul Thomas Anderson film Boogie Nights. He was also a contestant on Win Ben Stein's Money (taped in December 2000, aired in April 2001).

Recognition
In 2003, Tedeschi was inducted into the AVN Hall of Fame.

Awards 
Tedeschi has won a number of AVN Awards:

 1993 Best Supporting Actor - Video for Smeers
 1997 Best Supporting Actor - Video for Silver Screen Confidential
 1997 Best Supporting Actor - Film for The Show
 1997 Best Group Sex Scene - Film with Christy Canyon, Vince Vouyer, and Steven St. Croix for The Show
 1999 Best Anal Sex Scene - Film with Chloe, and Steve Hatcher for The Kiss

Personal life
He was married to fellow porn star Tina Tyler from 1993 to 1994.

See also

 Peter North
 Randy Spears

References

External links
 Hall of Fame - Class of 2003: Tony Tedeschi December 2003 Adult Video News article about the actor.
 
 
 

1964 births
American male pornographic film actors
Living people
Actors from Providence, Rhode Island
American people of Italian descent